A tin roof pie is a variation on ice cream cake. It consists of a base made from corn flakes, corn syrup, and peanuts. It is then layered with ice cream, chocolate syrup, and occasionally, crushed chocolate bars.

References

Ice cream
Chocolate desserts
Sweet pies